Vladimir Samsonov or Uładzimir Samsonaŭ (born 17 April 1976) is a Belarusian former professional table tennis player. He is known in China as the "Tai Chi Master" because of his superb all-around style, both offensive and defensive. Samsonov competed at six consecutive Olympics between 1996 and 2016, placing fourth individually in 2016, in addition to equal fifth in 1996 and 2000.

Career
Samsonov is also known as Mr. ECL (European Champions League), for winning a record 13 ECL titles (including two of its predecessor, European Club Cup of Champions) – three with Borussia (1997, 1998, 2000), and five each with Charleroi (2001, 2002, 2003, 2004, 2007) and Fakel Orenburg (2012, 2013, 2015, 2017, 2019). His 13 titles are not only the most ever by an athlete in table tennis, but also more than any male or female athlete has ever won in European Champions Leagues in all sports. He started playing for European top division clubs in 1994, when he signed with Borussia Düsseldorf, then six years later joined Royal Charleroi in Belgium. In 2008, he moved to Spain to play for SuperDivision club Cajagranada, but left after only one season to join the Russian Premier League club Fakel Orenburg, where he finished his career twelve years later.

Samsonov is famous for being a top-10 player longer than anyone else in official ranking history save for the legend of table tennis Jan-Ove Waldner. He first joined the top-10 in 1996, then climbed to the top position in 1998. He stayed in the top-10 for 15 years until November 2011. He is ranked #18 as of December 2017. He used to hold the distinction of being the player with most ITTF Pro/World Tour titles (27) until Ma Long surpassed him (28). He was runner-up in the 1997 World championships, and is also a three-time European champion (1998, 2003, 2005) and three-time World Cup winner (1999, 2001, 2009).

Samsonov was awarded the Richard Bergmann Fair Play Trophy at the world championships a record three times, in 2003, 2007 and 2013.

In 2021, despite qualifying for the Tokyo Olympics, his seventh time qualifying for the Olympics, Samsonov withdrew from the tournament and shortly after announced his retirement.

Personal life
Since the age of seven, Samsonov had been coached by Alexandre Petkevich. Samsonov is a polyglot, speaking Russian, English, German, Serbian, and Spanish.

References

Belarusian male table tennis players
1976 births
Living people
Table tennis players at the 1996 Summer Olympics
Table tennis players at the 2000 Summer Olympics
Table tennis players at the 2004 Summer Olympics
Table tennis players at the 2008 Summer Olympics
Table tennis players at the 2012 Summer Olympics
Table tennis players at the 2016 Summer Olympics
Olympic table tennis players of Belarus
Table tennis players at the 2015 European Games
European Games silver medalists for Belarus
Sportspeople from Minsk
European Games medalists in table tennis
Table tennis players at the 2019 European Games